The Detroit Tigers' 1994 season had a record of 53-62 in a strike-shortened season.  The season ended with the Tigers in 5th place in the newly formed American League East Division. The season featured the return of former star Kirk Gibson, the return of Ernie Harwell to the television broadcast booth and the 18th season of the Alan Trammell and Lou Whitaker double play combination.

Offseason
 November 1, 1993: Eric Davis was signed as a free agent by the Tigers.
 November 7, 1993: Joe Boever was signed as a free agent by the Tigers.
 February 4, 1994: Kirk Gibson was signed as a free agent by the Tigers.
 February 7, 1994: Tim Belcher was signed as a free agent by the Tigers.
 February 14, 1994: Juan Samuel was signed as a free agent by the Tigers.
 February 18, 1994: Kevin Morgan was traded by the Tigers to the New York Mets for Joe Dellicarri (minors).
 March 31, 1994: Rico Brogna was traded by the Tigers to the New York Mets for Alan Zinter.

Regular season

By Friday, August 12, the Tigers had compiled a 53-62 record through 115 games. They had scored 652 runs (5.67 per game) and had allowed 671 runs (5.83 per game).

The Tigers were struggling in terms of strikeouts, as their pitchers had combined for the fewest strikeouts (560) and their batters had combined for the most strikeouts (897) in the Majors. Tigers' pitchers also had the most intentional walks in the Majors (74), the fewest shutouts (1) and tied the Chicago White Sox and Los Angeles Dodgers for the fewest saves (20).

Season standings

Record vs. opponents

Notable transactions
 May 11, 1994: Jorge Velandia and Scott Livingstone were traded by the Tigers to the San Diego Padres for Gene Harris.
 June 17, 1994: Greg Cadaret was signed as a free agent by the Tigers.

Roster

Player stats

Batting

Starters by position
Note: Pos = Position; G = Games played; AB = At bats; H = Hits; Avg. = Batting average; HR = Home runs; RBI = Runs batted in

Other batters
Note: G = Games played; AB = At-bats; H = Hits; Avg. = Batting average; HR = Home runs; RBI = Runs batted in

Pitching

Starting pitchers 
Note: G = Games pitched; IP = Innings pitched; W = Wins; Losses; ERA = Earned run average; SO = Strikeouts

Other pitchers 
Note: G = Games pitched; IP = Innings pitched; W = Wins; L = Losses; ERA = Earned run average; SO = Strikeouts

Relief pitchers 
Note: G = Games pitched; W = Wins; L = Losses; SV = Saves; ERA = Earned run average; SO = Strikeouts

Farm system

LEAGUE CHAMPIONS: Niagara Falls<ref>Johnson, Lloyd, and Wolff, Miles, ed., The Encyclopedia of Minor League Baseball". Durham, North Carolina: Baseball America, 1997</ref>

References

External links

1994 Detroit Tigers season at Baseball Reference''

Detroit Tigers seasons
Detroit Tigers
Detroit
1994 in Detroit